Jamie Macmillan (born 23 September 1991) is a former professional Australian rules footballer who played for the North Melbourne Football Club in the Australian Football League (AFL). He was taken with draft pick number 37 in the 2009 National Draft, and played the following year, in the 2010 AFL season. Macmillan attended Scotch College Melbourne where he also played First XI cricket and was a proficient batsman and keeper. Macmillan made his debut in Round 17, against . He played junior football for the Camberwell Sharks in the Yarra Junior Football League.

References

External links

1991 births
Living people
North Melbourne Football Club players
Australian rules footballers from Victoria (Australia)
Oakleigh Chargers players
People educated at Scotch College, Melbourne